Angus Kernohan (born 2 March 1999) is an Irish rugby union player playing for RFU Championship side Ealing Trailfinders. He plays as a winger, but can also play at centre.

Early life
Born in Ballymena, Northern Ireland, Kernohan attended Ballymena Academy and first began playing rugby for Ballymena minis.

Club career
Kernohan joined the Ulster sub-academy for the 2017–18 season, but was not initially awarded a full academy contract ahead of the 2018–19 season. However, strong performances during pre-season saw him rewarded with a place in the academy shortly after the season began. He made his senior debut for Ulster in the provinces opening 2018–19 Pro14 fixture against Welsh side Scarlets on 1 September 2018, which Ulster won 15–13, and made his European Rugby Champions Cup debut during round 1 of the 2018–19 tournament, featuring off the bench in the provinces 24–10 win against English side Leicester Tigers on 13 October 2018.

On 13 May 2020, Kernohan travels to England to sign for Ealing Trailfinders in the RFU Championship from the 2020-21 season.

International career
Kernohan was part of the Ireland under-20s team that won a grand slam during the 2019 Six Nations Under 20s Championship. He missed the opening two rounds due to a hamstring injury, but returned for the final fixtures.

References

External links
Pro14 Profile

Ireland U20 Profile

1999 births
Living people
Sportspeople from Ballymena
People educated at Ballymena Academy
Irish rugby union players
Ballymena R.F.C. players
Queen's University RFC players
Ulster Rugby players
Ealing Trailfinders Rugby Club players
Rugby union wings
Rugby union centres